The Journal of Academic Librarianship is a peer-reviewed academic journal that covers all topics dealing with academic libraries. The journal publishes book reviews, analytical articles, and bibliographic essays. It was established in 1975 and is published by Elsevier.

History 
The Journal of Academic Librarianship was first published in March 1975 and has been a bimonthly publication ever since. It was initially edited by Richard M. Dougherty and William H. Webb. The current editor-in-chief is Amanda Folk (Ohio State University).

Abstracting and indexing
The journal is abstracted and indexed in:

According to the Journal Citation Reports, the journal has a 2020 impact factor of 1.533.

References

External links 
 

Library science journals
English-language journals
Bimonthly journals
Publications established in 1975
Elsevier academic journals